Ziaabad (also Romanized as Ẕīā’ābād, Zeyā’ābād, and Zīā’ābād; also known as Ziādābād) is a village in Khenejin Rural District, in the Central District of Komijan County, Markazi Province, Iran. At the 2006 census, its population was 339, in 78 families.

References 

Populated places in Komijan County